Frederick Morgan Taylor (April 17, 1903 – February 16, 1975) was an American hurdler and the first athlete to win three Olympic medals in the 400 m hurdles. He was the flag bearer for the United States at his last Olympics in 1932.

In 1924, Taylor won the 400 m Olympic trials with a world best time of 52.6 s, which was accepted as a national record, but not as a world record. While winning the gold medal at the 1924 Olympics he clocked the same time, but knocked one hurdle, and the record was again not ratified by the International Association of Athletics Federations (IAAF). In 1925, he won his second AAU title in the 440 yd hurdles in a world best time of 53.8 s, but this record was discounted too. Finally the IAAF accepted his 400 m record of 52.0 s set at the 1928 Olympic trials.

While studying at Grinnell College, Taylor competed in both track and field and football. He won the NCAA 220 yd hurdle title in 1927 and finished second in the long jump in 1925. After graduating he worked as a salesman for the Chicago Tribune and then as a teacher and athletics coach. His son F. Morgan Taylor Jr. also competed in track and field as a long jumper.

References

External links

 Hickok Sports History

1903 births
1975 deaths
Sportspeople from Sioux City, Iowa
Track and field athletes from Iowa
Grinnell College alumni
American male hurdlers
Athletes (track and field) at the 1924 Summer Olympics
Athletes (track and field) at the 1928 Summer Olympics
Athletes (track and field) at the 1932 Summer Olympics
Olympic gold medalists for the United States in track and field
Olympic bronze medalists for the United States in track and field
Sports world record setters
Medalists at the 1932 Summer Olympics
Medalists at the 1928 Summer Olympics
Medalists at the 1924 Summer Olympics